Strawberry is a small unincorporated community on the South Fork American River,  south-southwest of Pyramid Peak, along U.S. Route 50 in the foothills of the Sierra Nevada. The sign on the highway reads population 50.

The town became a popular resort in the 1850s, and a station along the Central Overland Pony Express between Yank's Station and Webster's, Sugar Loaf House Station. It was along the Lincoln Highway Sierra Nevada Southern Route by 1916. The site is now registered as California Historical Landmark #707.

Strawberry is also the home of Lovers Leap climbing area.

References

Pony Express stations
Unincorporated communities in the Sacramento metropolitan area
Unincorporated communities in California
Unincorporated communities in El Dorado County, California
California Historical Landmarks
Lincoln Highway